Tibia vara may refer to:
 Genu varum
 Blount's disease